Dyschirius pfefferi is a species of ground beetle in the subfamily Scaritinae. It was described by Kult in 1949.

References

pfefferi
Beetles described in 1949